Käsmu Bay is a bay in Lääne-Viru County, Estonia.

The bay is located between Käsmu and Vergi Peninsula. The bay's width is up to 4 km and depth of 12-27 m.

Käsmu Stream and Võsu River flows into the bay.

Borough of Võsu is located at the bay.

The bay is under protection (Lahemaa National Park).

References

Bays of Estonia
Lääne-Viru County